EBSA may refer to:

 Employee Benefits Security Administration
 European Billiards & Snooker Association